James Austin Butterfield (May 18, 1837 – July 6, 1891) was an American composer.   His best-known composition is When You and I Were Young, Maggie, first published in 1866 (lyrics by George W. Johnson).  Butterfield was born in England in 1837 and emigrated to the United States in 1856.

He was also the second president of the Music Teachers National Association, in 1878.

James A. Butterfield died in Chicago, Illinois and is buried in Graceland Cemetery.

References

External links
 

1837 births
1891 deaths
American male composers
19th-century American composers
19th-century American male musicians